North Elizabeth is a commuter railroad station in the city of Elizabeth, Union County, New Jersey, United States. Located at the North Avenue bridge crossing in Elizabeth, the station serves trains of NJ Transit's Northeast Corridor and North Jersey Coast Lines. North Elizabeth station features two high-level platforms for handicap accessibility under the Americans with Disabilities Act of 1990.

Service at this station is limited. As of November 8, 2020, there are 14 eastbound trains and 13 westbound trains serving the station on weekends.

History
The present station was opened by NJ Transit in February 1987, replacing a stop with low-level platforms.

Station layout
This station has two side platforms and four tracks. Each platform has a staircase at their northern ends going down to North Avenue, which crosses under the tracks, and another at their southern ends going up Hand Place, which crosses above the tracks. The station house and small parking lot are at the North Avenue end on the New York-bound platform. A larger parking lot is adjacent to the southbound platform.

References

External links

North Avenue entrance from Google Maps Street View

NJ Transit Rail Operations stations
Transportation in Elizabeth, New Jersey
Stations on the Northeast Corridor
Railway stations in Union County, New Jersey
Buildings and structures in Elizabeth, New Jersey
Railway stations in the United States opened in 1987